The Plomb du Cantal is the highest summit of Mounts of Cantal in the Massif Central, France. It is the second highest summit of the Massif Central, after the mountain of Puy de Sancy.

Geography and geology

The summit is located in the eastern part of the volcanic massif of the Cantal. Formed of basanite, it is a remnant of a basaltic lake formed of solidified lava and is the site of the most recent volcanic activity in the range. It was formed 2.9 million years ago, above an accumulation of several layers of pyroclastic trachyandesite.

Access

The summit is accessible from the ski resort of Super Lioran by a cable car and also from the pass of Prat-de-Bouc (in the east) via a hiking trail.

References

 
Volcanoes of Metropolitan France